deSol was an American band, based in Asbury Park, New Jersey. Described as "Rock & Roll with a Latin soul", the band's second full-length album, On My Way, was released on August 7, 2007.

Formation and touring
In January 2001 deSoL was officially formed. Located in Asbury Park, the band was able to start touring extensively on the east coast, working their trade. Their early years spent touring earned them a record deal they signed with Curb Records. deSoL quickly became a main stay in large tours as a supporting act, including an opening slot for REM at the Palacio de los Deportes in Mexico City. deSoL supported many acts including Blues Traveler, Los Lonely Boys, Ozomatli, Cypress Hill, Arrested Development and Widespread Panic. In 2005, deSoL toured extensively with the Legendary Wailers, playing to sold-out venues six nights a week for four months. This allowed the band to perfect its stage show and to gain national and international exposure. The band performed at all of the major festivals including Bonnaroo, Lollapalooza, Austin City Limits, All Good, South by Southwest, Langerado and Nashville River Stages.

During the latter half of 2006, the group embarked on an Armed Forces Entertainment tour. The group visited military bases in Kuwait, Qatar, Bahrain and Djibouti, performing for American service personnel.

deSoL released four albums during their career. The group received radio air play for their songs "Karma", "Blanco y Negro", "Sing it All Night" and "On My Way". In addition, deSoL got into the top 3 in the charts with their version of the Christmas song "Little Drummer Boy". The song continues to receive air play each December.

After years of personal change, the core group decided to step back for a few years to enjoy life and explore other hobbies.

Members
 Albie Monterrosa (2001–2020) - acoustic guitar/electric guitar/vocals
 Andy Letke (2001–2020) - piano/organ/accordion/vocals
 James Guerrero (2001–2020) - congas/bongo drums/percussion/vocals
 Chris Guice (C6) (2001–2020) - bass guitar/vocals
 Ron Shields (2001-2007) - drums
 Chris Stone (2007–2020) - drums
 Soto (2001/2016-2020) - Electric Guitar/vocals

Past members
 Armando Cabrera (2001–2005) - timbales/percussion
 George Saccal (2004–2005) - Drums
 Jeremy Hoenig (2005–2006) - Drums
 Ray Turull (2005–2006) - Percussion
 Ron Shields (2001-2003/ 2007) - Drums/timbales
 Kevin Ansell (2006–2008) - Electric Guitar, vocals
 Cliff Dill (2008) - Electric Guitar
 Jimmy Farkas (2008-2013) - Lead Guitar

Discography

Albums
Spanish Radio (2002, saZon Records)
deSoL (2005, Curb Records)
LiVe/ViVo EP (2006, saZon Records)
On My Way (saZon Records 2007)

Singles
 "Karma" - 2005
 "Little Drummer Boy" - #6 Billboard - 2005
 "Blanco y Negro" - 2005
 "Sing it All Night" - 2007
 "On My Way" - 2008

See also
Music of New Jersey

External links
Official DeSoL website
DeSoL on Myspace
DeSoL TV
DeSoL on ReverbNation

Rock music groups from New Jersey
Latin music groups
Asbury Park, New Jersey
Musical groups established in 2001